The Guanyin Bridge, formerly known as Tongyuan Bridge, Sizi Bridge or Jiyi Bridge, is a historic stone arch bridge over the Xiang River in Honghuagang District of Zunyi, Guizhou, China.

History
The bridge was originally built as "Tongyuan Bridge" in 1368, at the dawn of the Ming dynasty (1368–1644). It was one of the "Eight Views of Zunyi" during that time.

In 1796, in the reign of Jiaqing Emperor of the Qing dynasty (1644–1911), the bridge was destroyed by a catastrophic flood. A local magnate donated property to rebuild it for asking the god to bless him to have a son. After completion, the bridge was renamed "Sizi Bridge". The pronunciation of the characters "Sizi" and "Shizi" are similar, so the local people called it "Shizi Bridge".

In 1916, the bridge was devastated by a devastating flood again. The reconstruction project of the bridge was launched in the autumn of that same year and was completed in spring of the next year. The name was changed to "Jiyi Bridge". Tang Jiyao, the then Military Governor of Yunnan, attended the opening ceremony.

During the ten-year Cultural Revolution, the stone sculptures on the bridge was demolished by the Red Guards. In May 1986, Zunyi Municipal Government appropriated a large sum of money for redecorating. In December 2003, it was designated as a municipal level cultural relic preservation organ by the local government.

Architecture
There are stone lions, stone arhats, stone drums and other stone carvings on the bridge.

References

Bridges in Guizhou
Arch bridges in China
Bridges completed in 1917
Buildings and structures completed in 1917
1917 establishments in China